Brendan Tuckerman (born 20 March 1985), who performs as Tuka, is an Australian hip hop artist from the Blue Mountains, New South Wales. He is a member of Thundamentals and a previous member of Rumpunch and Connect 4. He is also a solo artist, having released three studio albums, and he co-produces his original music. He supported Horrorshow on their "Listen Close" tour and in late 2015 toured Australia and the US on his first headline tour to support his third album Life Death Time Eternal (10 July 2015). He felt this album was less introspective. It peaked at number 6 on the ARIA Albums Chart.

Influences

Tuckerman cites Wu-Tang Clan and "people like Mos Def" as role models when younger (though if it were now, it would be Kendrick Lamar). Additionally, Tuckerman has described acts such as Urthboy and Ozi Batla of The Herd as musically "super inspiring".

Discography

Studio albums

Extended plays

Singles

As lead artist

As featured artist

Music videos

Guest appearances

References

Australian hip hop musicians
Living people
1985 births